Skumbim Sulejmani (born 2 August 1986) is a Macedonian-Albanian retired football player who holds a Swiss passport as well.

Club career
Born in Kumanovo, modern day North Macedonia, Sulejmani grew up in Switzerland and played for the FC Luzern youth team among others. In May 2016, he joined SC Kriens after six years with Zug 94.

References

External links
Football.ch profile
 Swiss career stats – SFL

1986 births
Living people
Sportspeople from Kumanovo
Albanian footballers from North Macedonia
Swiss people of Albanian descent
Swiss people of Macedonian descent
Macedonian emigrants to Switzerland
Association football forwards
Macedonian footballers
FC Luzern players
FC Locarno players
FC Tuggen players
SC Kriens players
Swiss 1. Liga (football) players
Swiss Super League players
Swiss Challenge League players
2. Liga Interregional players
Swiss Promotion League players